The 2001 Targa Tasmania was the tenth running of the Tarmac Rally event and saw the event extended to a six-day format to mark the decade milestone.  It was held between 18 April 2001 and 24 April 2001 on 54 competitive closed road stages in the state of Tasmania, Australia.

Stages

Results

Modern Competition

Classic Competition

Historic Competition

References

External links

Road rallying
Motorsport in Tasmania
Targa Tasmania
Rally competitions in Australia
2001 in rallying